William Kilipota Thole (born 2 October 1998) is a Malawian professional footballer who plays as a goalkeeper for the Malawian club Mighty Wanderers, and the Malawi national team.

International career
Tholemade his international debut with the Malawi national team in a 1–0 friendly loss to Zambia on 12 March 2020. He was part of the Malawi squad the 2021 Africa Cup of Nations.

References

External links
 
 

1998 births
Living people
Malawian footballers
Malawi international footballers
Association football goalkeepers
2021 Africa Cup of Nations players